Bernard O'Reilly (1 March 1803 – after 23 January 1856) was an Irish-born prelate of the Roman Catholic Church. Known for his service during the 1832 cholera outbreak in New York, he later served as Bishop of Hartford from 1850 until his death in 1856.

Biography
O'Reilly was born in Columcille, County Longford, and embarked for the United States in January 1825 with the intention of studying for the priesthood. He attended the Seminary of Montreal in Quebec, Canada, before completing his theological studies at St. Mary's Seminary in Baltimore, Maryland. His brother was the Rev. William O'Reilly, who was the pastor in the late 1840s of St. Raymond's Church (Bronx, New York) in the Diocese of New York, later rector of Our Lady of the Isle (Newport, Rhode Island), and eventually Vicar General of the Diocese of Hartford.

Bernard was ordained a priest in New York by Bishop Francis Kenrick on 13 October 1831. He was then assigned to St. James Church on Jay Street in Brooklyn, where he distinguished himself for his heroism during the cholera outbreak in 1832 and twice fell victim to the disease himself. He was transferred to St. Patrick's Church, Rochester in December 1832, and remained there until he became vicar general of the Diocese of Buffalo in 1847, where his duties included supervising the seminary.

On 9 August 1850, O'Reilly was appointed the second Bishop of Hartford, Connecticut, by Pope Pius IX. He received his episcopal consecration on the following 10 November from Bishop John Timon, CM, with Bishops John McCloskey and John Bernard Fitzpatrick serving as co-consecrators, at Rochester. He worked to secure priests for the diocese, and defended Catholics from the anti-Catholic movements of the era. He funded St. Mary's Theological Seminary, located initially in the episcopal residence, and taught the first week of classes. In 1852 he traveled to Europe in an attempt to obtain more priests for the diocese. Among those recruited were a number of students from All Hallows College, Dublin, as well as Thomas Francis Hendricken, of Maynooth, future Bishop of the Diocese of Providence. The seminarians were ordained before they left Ireland.

In May 1851, twenty-one Catholic soldiers were imprisoned at Fort Columbus in New York for failure to attend Protestant religious services. One of the soldiers was tried and found guilty of disobedience of orders. O'Reilly wrote letters to the Boston Pilot under the pseudonym "Roger Williams" denouncing such official bigotry. The matter was appealed to the War Department which in July overturned the ruling. 

He attended the First Plenary Council of Baltimore in 1852. In 1855, Bishop O'Reilly introduced the Sisters of Mercy to the diocese. They established their motherhouse in Providence, which proved to be a hotbed of virulent Know Nothing anti-Catholicism. O'Reilly had previously encountered such sentiments directed at the Sisters of Charity hospital in Rochester. On this occasion he faced down an angry mob that had gathered before the convent. He also built three orphan asylums.

O'Reilly visited Europe in December 1855. Returning in late January 1856, after visiting his parents, he sailed from Liverpool on the SS Pacific which vanished with all aboard under circumstances that remain a mystery to the present day.

See also

 Catholic Church in the United States
 Historical list of the Catholic bishops of the United States
 List of Catholic bishops of the United States
 Lists of patriarchs, archbishops, and bishops

References

External links
Roman Catholic Archdiocese of Hartford

1803 births
1856 deaths
19th-century Irish people
19th-century Roman Catholic bishops in the United States
Irish expatriate Catholic bishops
People from County Longford
St. Mary's Seminary and University alumni
Irish emigrants to the United States (before 1923)
Roman Catholic bishops of Hartford
People lost at sea